Məlikballı (also Malikballi and Melikbally) is a village and municipality in the Ujar Rayon of Azerbaijan.  It has a population of 1,372.

Notes

External links
 "Malikballi Map — Satellite Images of Malikballi" Maplandia World Gazetteer 

Populated places in Ujar District